The Hon. Edward Keppel Wentworth Coke (20 August 1824 – 26 May 1889) was a British soldier and Whig politician.

Background
Coke was the second son of Thomas Coke, 1st Earl of Leicester, by his second wife Lady Anne Amelia, daughter of William Keppel, 4th Earl of Albemarle. Thomas Coke, 2nd Earl of Leicester was his elder brother and the Hon. Wenman Coke was his younger brother.

The bowler hat was created for Edward Coke in 1849.

Military and political career
Coke was a captain in the Scots Fusiliers. He was returned to Parliament for Norfolk West in 1847, a seat he held until 1852. He also served as High Sheriff of Derbyshire in 1859.

He stood as the Liberal Unionist candidate for South Derbyshire in 1886.

Family
Coke married the Hon. Diana Agar-Ellis, daughter of George Agar-Ellis, 1st Baron Dover, in 1851. He died in May 1889, aged 64. His wife survived him by just over a year and died in July 1890.

References

External links 
 

1824 births
1889 deaths
Younger sons of earls
Members of the Parliament of the United Kingdom for English constituencies
UK MPs 1847–1852
Whig (British political party) MPs for English constituencies
Royal Scots Fusiliers officers
High Sheriffs of Derbyshire
Liberal Unionist Party parliamentary candidates